Deb Pearce is a Canadian broadcaster and comedian, who, in the 2000s, hosted the midday program and then co-hosted the morning program with Patrick Marano on 103.9 Proud FM in Toronto, Ontario. She was previously a host on 92.5 Jack FM. After being let go from Proud FM, she became a host of television programming, including Rogers Television's foQus and OUTtv's Bump!.

An out lesbian, Pearce has previously performed as a drag king.

References

Living people
Women performance artists
Canadian radio hosts
Canadian television hosts
Canadian women television hosts
Canadian women radio presenters
Canadian drag kings
Lesbian comedians
Canadian LGBT broadcasters
21st-century Canadian LGBT people
Year of birth missing (living people)
Canadian LGBT comedians